Wisden Asia Cricket was a monthly English language cricket magazine produced by the British-based cricket publishing company Wisden.

History and profile
Wisden Asia Cricket was founded in 2001. The first issue was published in December 2001. The magazine was based in Mumbai, India. It was a sister publication to the British focused The Wisden Cricketer. Some articles appeared in both publications. In 2002 the Gulf edition of Wisden Asia Cricket was started.

Wisden Asia Cricket closed down after its July 2005 edition, but in December 2005 the Wisden Group announced that a new magazine called Cricinfo Magazine which was published for the first time in January 2006. While it has no geographical designation in its name, it is aimed primarily at Indian cricket enthusiasts in India and elsewhere, and the initial editorial team was inherited from Wisden Cricket Asia.

References

External links
 Official website (part of the Cricinfo site)

2005 disestablishments in India
2001 establishments in India
Defunct cricket magazines
Defunct magazines published in India
Monthly magazines published in India
Sports magazines published in India
Magazines established in 2001
Magazines disestablished in 2005
Mass media in Mumbai
Wisden